The Jingxi Hotel is a hotel located in the Haidian District of Beijing, China, located near the Military Museum and Defense Ministry and run by the Agency for Offices Administration of the Central Military Commission. The hotel is heavily guarded and closed to the general public.

Overview 
Built in 1959 for the 10th anniversary of the People's Republic, the hotel soon became a place for top-level meetings.

It has been the venue of plenary sessions of the Central Committee of the Communist Party of China, and has witnessed historical events, such as Luo Ruiqing's attempted suicide, the "show trial" of General Chen Zaidao during the Cultural Revolution, the decision to crack down on the Gang of Four, as well as a meeting held less than three weeks after the military crushed the Tiananmen Square protests of 1989, where the Central Committee affirmed that the party had "achieved a decisive victory in stopping the unrest and quelling the counter-revolutionary rebellion."

Other important meetings to have taken place here include the pivotal 3rd Plenum of the 11th Central Committee in 1978, when China embarked on economic reforms, and the 3rd and 4th Plenums of the 18th Central Committee under the auspices of Xi Jinping, General Secretary of the Communist Party of China.

The closest subway station is Military Museum Station, on Line 1 and Line 9 of the Beijing Subway.

See also
 Diaoyutai Guesthouse
 List of hotels in Beijing

References

External links
 Jingxi Hotel on TripAdvisor

Hotels in Beijing
Haidian District
Hotels established in 1959
Hotel buildings completed in 1959